Dean Hughes (born August 24, 1943) is an author of historical novels and children's books. He has written 105 books as well as various poems and short stories. As a member of the Church of Jesus Christ of Latter-day Saints, Hughes is a prominent author of LDS fiction for children and juveniles. Many of Hughes's books are sports or war themed. Hughes is most well known for his historical World War II era Children of the Promise series for adults. His novel Midway to Heaven was adapted into a feature-length film in 2011. Before he became a full-time author, Hughes taught English at Central Missouri State University. He taught creative writing at Brigham Young University.

Biography
Dean Hughes was born on August 24, 1943 in Ogden, Utah. After his senior year in high school, Dean Hughes started his first novel; however, the novel was rejected. He attended Weber State University studying English, and received a Masters in creative writing and a PhD in literature from the University of Washington. Before he became a full-time writer, he taught English at Central Missouri State University for 8 years. Hughes also taught creative writing at Brigham Young University.

In 1979, Dean Hughes published his first book, Under the Same Stars. Since 1979, Hughes has written and published 105 books. Hughes has published poems, books, and short stories for a variety of ages. Much of his writing is targeted to children and young adults (particularly sports-themed and World War II-era books), although he is also well known to adult readers of LDS Fiction for Children of the Promise and Hearts of the Children series, set in World War II and Vietnam War eras respectively. According to Eugene England, Hughes is one of the authors of the fourth and current period of Mormon literature who is credited with writing high quality children's and young adult literature.

In 2001, his World War II novel Soldier Boys was published. In September 2013, Hughes celebrated the publication of his 100th book, Through Cloud and Sunshine. Hughes's 2003 novel, Midway to Heaven, was adapted into a feature-length film of the same title in 2011. This was the first of Hughes's published works to be adapted into a film.

Hughes was the keynote speaker for Brigham Young University-Idaho's Education week in June 2018.

Personal life
Dean Hughes is married to Kathleen Hurst Hughes and has three children and nine grandchildren. They live in Midway, Utah. Hughes and his wife Kathy served an LDS mission in Nauvoo, Illinois. Hughes is a member of the Church of Jesus Christ of Latter-day Saints.

Awards
In 2005, Hughes won the Smith-Pettit Foundation Award for Outstanding Contribution to Mormon Letters for Children of the Promise. In 2007, Hughes received a Lifetime Achievement award at the inaugural Whitney Awards. In April 2013 he was awarded an Outstanding Achievement AML Award.

He has also received AML Awards for Young Adult Literature (1994) for The Trophy, Novel (1998) for Far from Home, and Novel (2019) for Muddy: Where Faith and Polygamy Collide. He was a finalist or received an honorable mention in 2005 and 2007.

Bibliography (books only)
Bibliographical items are found on the Mormon Literature & Creative Arts website.

Fiction series

Adventures of Young Joseph Williams
1. Under the Same Stars (1979) 
2. As Wide as the River (January, 2005) 
3. Facing the Enemy (1982)

Nutty Nutshell
1. Nutty for President (February, 1986) 
2. Nutty and the Case of the Ski-Slope Spy (September, 1985) 
3. Nutty and the Case of the Mastermind Thief (March, 1985) 
4. Nutty Can't Miss (March, 1988) 
5. Nutty Knows All (August, 1988) 
6. Nutty, the Movie Star (October, 1991) 
7. Nutty's Ghost (March, 1993) 
8. Re-Elect Nutty! (June, 1995)

Hooper Haller
1. Hooper Haller (June, 1981) 
2. Jenny Haller (1983)

Lucky Ladd
1. Lucky Ladd #1: Lucky's Crash Landing (October, 1990) 
2. Lucky Ladd #2: Lucky Breaks Loose (November, 1990) 
3. Lucky Ladd #3: Lucky's Gold Mine (November, 1990) 
4. Lucky Ladd #4: Lucky Fights Back (September, 1991) 
5. Lucky Ladd #5: Lucky's Mud Festival (October, 1991) 
6. Lucky Ladd #6: Lucky's Tricks (June, 1992) 
7. Lucky Ladd #7: Lucky the Detective (July, 1992) 
8. Lucky Ladd #8: Lucky's Cool Club (October, 1993) 
9. Lucky Ladd #9: Lucky in Love (October, 1993) 
10.Lucky Ladd #10: Lucky Comes Home (October, 1994)

Angel Park All Stars
1. Angel Park All-Stars #1: Making the Team (March, 1990) 
2. Angel Park All-Stars #2: Big Base Hit (March, 1990) 
3. Angel Park All-Stars #3: Winning Streak (May, 1990) 
4. Angel Park All-Stars #4: What a Catch! (May, 1990) 
5. Angel Park All-Stars #5: Rookie Star (July, 1990) 
6. Angel Park All-Stars #6: Pressure Play (August, 1990) 
7. Angel Park All-Stars #7: Line Drive (August, 1990) 
8. Angel Park All-Stars #8: Championship Game (September, 1990) 
9. Angel Park All-Stars #9: Superstar Team (March, 1991) 
10.Angel Park All-Stars #10: Stroke of Luck (March, 1991) 
11.Angel Park All-Stars #11: Safe at First (April, 1991) 
12.Angel Park All-Stars #12: Up to Bat (June, 1991) 
13.Angel Park All-Stars #13: Play-Off (June, 1991) 
14.Angel Park All-Stars #14: All Together Now (July, 1991)

Angel Park Soccer Stars
1. Angel Park Soccer Stars #1: Kickoff Time (October, 1991) 
2. Angel Park Soccer Stars #2: Defense! (October, 1991) 
3. Angel Park Soccer Stars #3: Victory Goal (February, 1992) 
4. Angel Park Soccer Stars #4: Psyched! (March, 1992) 
5. Angel Park Soccer Stars #5: Backup Goalie (April, 1992) 
6. Angel Park Soccer Stars #6: Total Soccer (May, 1992) 
7. Angel Park Soccer Stars #7: Shake-Up (September, 1993) 
8. Angel Park Soccer Stars #8: Quarterback Hero (August, 1994)

Angel Park Hoop Stars
1. Angel Park Hoop Stars #1: Nothing But Net (October, 1992) 
2. Angel Park Hoop Stars #2: Point Guard (October, 1992) 
3. Angel Park Hoop Stars #3: Go to the Hoop! (January, 1993) 
4. Angel Park Hoop Stars #4: On the Line (February, 1993)

Angel Park Karate Stars
1. Angel Park Karate Stars #1: Find the Power (May, 1994)

Children Of The Promise
1. Children of the Promise, Vol. 1: Rumors of War (June, 1997) 
2. Children of the Promise, Vol. 2: Since You Went Away (October, 1997) 
3. Children of the Promise, Vol. 3: Far from Home (September, 1998) 
4. Children of the Promise, Vol. 4: When We Meet Again (November, 1999)  
5. Children of the Promise, Vol. 5: As Long as I Have You (October, 2000)

Scrappers
1. Scrappers #1: Play Ball! (Match, 1999) 
2. Scrappers #2: Home Run Hero (March, 1999) 
3. Scrappers #3: Team Player (April, 1999) 
4. Scrappers #4: Now We're Talking (May, 1999) 
5. Scrappers #5: Bases Loaded (June, 1999) 
6. Scrappers #6: No Easy Out (July, 1999) 
7. Scrappers #7: Take Your Base (August, 1999) 
8. Scrappers #8: No Fear (September, 1999) 
9. Scrappers, #9: Grand Slam (October, 1999)

Hearts of the Children
1. Hearts of the Children, Vol. 1: The Writing on the Wall (October, 2001) 
2. Hearts of the Children, Vol. 2: Troubled Waters (October, 2002) 
3. Hearts of the Children, Vol. 3: How Many Roads? (January, 2003) 
4. Hearts of the Children, Vol. 4: Take Me Home (October, 2004) 
5. Hearts of the Children, Vol. 5: So Much of Life Ahead (September, 2005)

Come to Zion
1. Come to Zion, Vol. 1: The Winds and the Waves (June, 2012) 
2. Come to Zion, Vol. 2: Through Cloud and Sunshine (January, 2013) 
3. Come to Zion, Vol. 3: Fresh Courage Take (May, 2014)

Muddy River
1. Muddy: Where Faith and Polygamy Collide (May 2019) 
2. River: Where Faith and Consecration Converge (March 2020)

Standalone Fiction
Honestly, Myron (March, 1982) 
Switching Tracks (September, 1982) 
Family Pose (March, 1989) 
Family Picture (March, 1990) 
Lullaby and Goodnight (March, 1992) 
Quick Moves (September, 1993) 
End of the Race (October, 1993)  
Jelly's Circus (August, 1986) 
Brothers (January, 1986) 
Theo Zephyr (September, 1987) 
Cornbread and Prayer (June, 1988) 
The Trophy (September, 1994) 
One-Man Team (October, 1994) 
Backup Soccer Star (March, 1995) 
Team Picture (October, 1996) 
Brad and Butter: Play Ball! (March, 1998) 
Soldier Boys (December, 2001) 
Midway to Heaven (2004) 
Search and Destroy (2005) 
Saboteur: A Novel of Love and War (August, 2006) 
Before the Dawn (August, 2007) 
Promises to Keep: Diane's Story (October, 2008) 
Missing in Action (March, 2010) 
Home and Away (October, 2015) 
Four-Four-Two (November, 2016) 
Displaced (September 2020)

Non-Fiction
The Mormon Church: A Basic History (1986) 
Baseball Tips Book (February, 1993) 
Great Stories from Mormon History (with Tom Hughes)(June, 1994) 
All Moms Go To Heaven (2005) 
The Cost of Winning: Coming in First Across The Wrong Finish Line (2008)

References

External links

Official website
Bio at official website
 
Author website at publisher Deseret Book
Dean Hughes papers, MSS 1981 at the L. Tom Perry Special Collections, Harold B. Lee Library, Brigham Young University

1943 births
American Latter Day Saint writers
20th-century American novelists
American children's writers
Brigham Young University faculty
Living people
University of Washington alumni
Novelists from Utah
Weber State University alumni
21st-century American novelists
American male novelists
Latter Day Saints from Utah
Latter Day Saints from Washington (state)
Latter Day Saints from Missouri
21st-century American non-fiction writers
American male non-fiction writers
20th-century American male writers
21st-century American male writers
Harold B. Lee Library-related 20th century articles